The Legislative Assembly, also known as the Parliament of Samoa, is the national legislature of Samoa, seated at Apia, where the country's central administration is situated. Samoan Parliament is composed of two parts: the O le Ao o le Malo (head of state) and the Legislative Assembly.

In the Samoan language, the Legislative Assembly of Samoa is sometimes referred to as the Samoan Fono while the government of the country is referred to as the Malo. The word fono is a Samoan and Polynesian term for councils or meetings great and small and applies to national assemblies and legislatures, as well as local village councils.

The modern government of Samoa exists on a national level alongside the country's fa'amatai indigenous chiefly system of governance and social organisation. In his or her own right, the O le Ao o le Malo can summon and call together the Legislative Assembly, and can prorogue or dissolve Parliament, in order to either end a parliamentary session or call a general election on behalf of the Prime Minister of Samoa.

History

The Samoan Fono is descended from the Western Samoan Legislative Assembly established under New Zealand rule in the early 1900s. On the country's political independence in 1962, the 5th Legislative Assembly became the 1st Western Samoan Parliament.

Powers and procedures
The Samoan Constitution provides the Legislative Assembly to make laws for the whole or any part of Samoa and laws having effect outside as well
as within Samoa. Any Member of Parliament may introduce any bill or propose any motion for debate in the Assembly or present any petition to
the Assembly, and the same shall be considered and disposed of under the provisions of the Standing Orders.

Members of Parliament possess parliamentary privilege and immunities.

The Legislative Assembly can be dissolved or prorogue by the O le Ao o le Malo, with the advice of the Prime Minister.

Members of Parliament
Prior to a 2019 constitutional amendment, the Samoan Fono had 49 Members of Parliament. These were elected in six two-seat and 35 single-seat constituencies. Of these 49 seats, 47 were legally reserved for traditional heads of families (matai) and two for special constituencies: These two seats were first reserved for Samoan citizens descended from non-Samoans (so-called 'individual constituencies') and elected on a non-territorial basis until the 2015 constitutional amendment after which these were replaced with specific 'urban constituencies'. These 'urban constituencies' were only in place for the 2016 general election and were then abolished by the 2019 amendment ahead of the next general election. Following this amendment, each electoral constituency elects one member, totalling 51 members of parliament.

An extra Member of Parliament was added after the 2016 election in order to meet the quota of 10% female MPs.

Members of Parliament in Samoa are directly elected by universal suffrage, and serve a five-year term.

Current composition
The Fa‘atuatua i le Atua Samoa ua Tasi (FAST) government currently occupies 32 seats in the Legislative Assembly, whilst the Human Rights Protection party (HRPP) have 18. Three members are independents. The HRPP originally won 25 seats at the 2021 election, but lost seven due to electoral petitions. The seven vacancies resulted in by-elections. Following these elections, FAST won five out of the seven constituencies up for election, increasing their parliamentary seat count from 26 to 31. The HRPP could only retain two seats but gained another two when female candidates who lost their respective races but attained the highest percentage nationwide amongst losing candidates were declared elected in order to fulfil parliament's female quota. Therefore increasing the total amount of seats to 53. The speaker of the Legislative Assembly announced on 10 December that the two MPs declared elected via the female parliamentary membership quota would not be sworn in until the Supreme Court finalises legal challenges on the matter. Seven of the new MPs were sworn in on 14 December 2021. Another vacancy occurred with the death of FAST MP Va'ele Pa'ia'aua Iona Sekuini on 25 March 2022, reducing the caucus' seat total to 30. Three additional female members were sworn in on 17 May 2022, two from the HRPP and one from FAST. FAST gained a seat following the victory Fo'isala Lilo Tu'u Ioane in a by-election.

Head of State

The ceremonial Head of State or O le Ao o le Malo is elected for a five-year term by the Fono. O le Ao o le Malo is limited to a maximum of 2 terms.

Elections
Elections are held under a simple plurality system.  Samoan electors are divided into 51 single member constituencies.
Electors must be Samoan citizens and aged over 21.  Candidates must be qualified as electors, and are required hold a matai title.

Last election results

Terms of parliament
The Legislative Assembly is currently in its 17th session, its convention did not occur until several months after the 2021 Samoan general election was held, due to the 2021 Samoan constitutional crisis. The 17th parliament convened for the first time on 14 September 2021.

Building

The Fono is housed in a beehive shaped building based on the traditional Samoan fale.

See also

Electoral Constituencies of Samoa
List of speakers of the Legislative Assembly of Samoa
Politics of Samoa
List of legislatures by country

Notes

References

External links
 

1962 establishments in Western Samoa
Samoa
Government of Samoa
Samoa
Politics of Samoa
Political organisations based in Samoa
Samoa

de:Samoa#Politik